Angell Town is an area in Brixton, in the London Borough of Lambeth, south London. The area is dominated by the Angell Town Estate, a housing estate known for its poverty, deprivation and gang subculture.

The Angell Town Estate was originally built in the 1970s as a set of blocks linked by a deck-access system. Following the efforts of local resident and community leader Dora Boatemah, the estate was extensively redeveloped in the early 2000s in an attempt to remove the architectural problems that had exacerbated the estate's social problems.

The neighborhood, which predates the estate, was named after John Angell, and first developed in the mid 19th century. The local parish is St John, Angell Town, Brixton, in the Diocese of Southwark, and the local church is St John the Evangelist Church, Angell Town, originally constructed in 1852–3. The area has a small park, Angell Town Park, at the centre of the estate. The local school is St John's Angell Town Church of England Primary School.

Nearby railway stations are Brixton railway station and Loughborough Junction railway station. Max Roach Park lies to the south, and Myatt's Fields Park to the north-east.

References

See also 
 Rosemarie Mallett

Brixton
Housing estates in London
Districts of the London Borough of Lambeth